Johan Markus Davidsson (born January 6, 1976) is a Swedish former professional ice hockey player, who played last with HV71 in the Swedish elite league Elitserien. He was a long-time Elitserien player and captain of HV71, with which he has won the Swedish championship four times.

Playing career 
Davidsson wears jersey number 76 and is the captain of HV71. In 2005 Davidsson renewed his contract with HV71 until the end of season 2009–10. He is regarded as an able skater with a good eye for the game and is as good as a playmaker as a scorer. He has got fine puck control but lacks the physical aspects of the game to fit in NHL. He has been awarded the Swedish hockey journalists association prize Rinkens riddare (Knight of the Rink) for three consecutive seasons, 2002–03, 2003–04 and 2004–05, and the Elitserien's referee association prize Årets gentleman (Gentleman of the Year, which resembles Lady Byng Memorial Trophy of the NHL) for two consecutive seasons, 2002–03 and 2003–04. In 2009, he was awarded Guldhjälmen (Golden Helmet, resembling the Lester Pearson Award) as Elitserien's most valuable player.

Davidsson played his first Swedish Elite League game on January 14, 1993, scoring a goal when HV71 defeated Djurgårdens IF, 4–3, in the Stockholm Globe Arena. His first appearance for Sweden's national team was on November 7, 1996, in a game in Helsinki, Finland, when Sweden defeated the Czech Republic, 3–1, during the Karjala Tournament. Davidsson was drafted in the 1994 NHL Entry Draft by Anaheim Ducks with their second choice, the 28th overall selection.

In the 2007 World Championships, Davidsson won the point scoring league with 14 points, just one point past Russia's Alexei Morozov. The 2007 tournament was Davidsson's best World Championships personally, having only scored three points in his previous two tournaments.

During the end of 2009 and beginning of 2010, Davidsson received contract proposals from the Kontinental Hockey League and Swiss National League A but choose to stay in Sweden, signing a five-year deal with his current club HV71.

Off the ice 
Davidsson figured in Swedish news when he dated the Finnish violinist Linda Lampenius in 2003. During the 2006 World Championships he appeared as colour commentator on TV3 Sweden.

International play 
Davidsson played a total of 129 games for Sweden. His last game for Sweden was played in 2009. After declining an offer by coach Pär Mårts to play in the 2011 Karjala Tournament, Davidsson officially retired from international play on 26 October 2011.

Awards 
 TV-pucken champion with Småland in 1990 and 1991.
 European Junior Championship's Best Forward in 1994.
 Named to the European Junior Championship All-Star Team in 1994.
 Swedish Champion with HV71 in 1995, 2004, 2008 and 2010.
 World Junior Championship's Best Player of Team Sweden in 1996.
 Finnish Champion with HIFK in 1998.
 Played in Elitserien All-Star Game in 2002.
 Bronze medal at the Ice Hockey World Championship in 2002.
 Silver medal at the Ice Hockey World Championship in 2003 and 2004.
 Awarded Årets gentleman (Elitserien Gentleman of the Year) in 2003 and 2004.
 Awarded Rinkens riddare (Elitserien Knight of the Rink) in 2003, 2004 and 2005.
 Named to the Swedish All-Star Team in 2003, 2004 and 2008.
 Awarded Guldpucken in 2004.
 Awarded Guldhjälmen in 2009.
 Elitserien playoff silver medal with HV71 in 2009.

Records 
 Elitserien 2003–04 playoff record for points (17)

Career statistics

Regular season and playoffs

International

Statistics as of May 13, 2007.

References

External links

 Davidsson retires (Swedish)

1976 births
Cincinnati Mighty Ducks players
Espoo Blues players
HIFK (ice hockey) players
HV71 players
Living people
Anaheim Ducks draft picks
Mighty Ducks of Anaheim players
New York Islanders players
Sportspeople from Jönköping
Stefan Liv Memorial Trophy winners
Swedish expatriate ice hockey players in Finland
Swedish expatriate ice hockey players in the United States
Swedish ice hockey centres